The Healthcare Systems Bureau is part of the Health Resources and Services Administration (HRSA), of the United States Department of Health and Human Services.

Overview 

HRSA oversees the nation's organ and tissue donation and transplantation systems, poison control and vaccine injury compensation programs, and a drug discount program for certain safety-net health care providers.

Key facts 

In FY 2008, HRSA provided $23 million to promote the donation of organs and tissues and improve national procurement, allocation and transplantation activities.  Nearly 100,000 Americans are on organ transplant waiting lists, and about 28,000 transplant procedures are performed annually. On average, 77 patients undergo transplant surgeries each day, and 19 die for lack of donated organs.
Since 1988, more than 2,200 families and individuals thought to have been injured by certain vaccines have been awarded over $1.8 billion through the National Vaccine Injury Compensation Program. The program seeks to encourage immunizations by assuring those few patients who experience side effects that they will be compensated or that the survivors of those killed by vaccines will also be compensated.
HRSA funds the improvement and stabilization of poison control centers across the United States, ensuring that the more than 2.4 million poison exposures reported each year to the nation's poison control centers are treated over the phone with guidance from Poison Control Centers' trained health care professionals.
HRSA's 340B Program lets health centers, HIV/AIDS clinics and operators of certain other federal safety-net programs buy outpatient drugs at significant discounts.
HRSA funds the improvement and stabilization of poison control centers across the United States, ensuring that the more than 2.4 million poison exposures reported each year to the nation's poison control centers are treated over the phone with guidance from Poison Control Centers' trained health care professionals.

History 
The Healthcare Systems Bureau was formerly the Bureau of Health Resources Development, which was created at the end of the Public Health Service reorganizations of 1966–1973 by combining the Community Health Service and the Health Facilities Planning and Construction Service from the recently abolished Health Services and Mental Health Administration (HSMHA).  It became the Office of Special Programs in 1997 and the Healthcare Systems Bureau in 2004.

Activities

Transplantation 

HRSA oversees the Organ Procurement and Transplantation Network and the Scientific Registry of Transplant Recipients in addition to promoting national awareness of the critical need for organ and tissue donation. HRSA also provides staff and logistics support to the Advisory Committee on Organ Transplantation, which makes recommendations to the Secretary of the U.S. Department of Health and Human Services on issues concerning organ donation and transplantation.

Under the C.W. Bill Young Cell Transplantation Program and National Cord Blood Inventory, HRSA helps make possible blood stem cell transplants for patients with life-threatening blood disorders who lack a related donor. Stem cells for transplant come from adult volunteer donors and umbilical cord blood units donated to public cord blood banks. The program recruits adult volunteer donors, helps member cord blood banks collect and list additional units, and supports research to improve the results of unrelated donor transplants.

Poison Control Program 

HRSA awards grants to the nation's 61 poison control centers and manages the national toll-free poison help line, 1-800-222-1222.

340B Drug Pricing Program 

340B Drug Program is appliable to hospitals (mixed-use and outpatient clinics) and contract pharmacies.  The 340B Program is often managed by software for maximizing the savings and for providing compliance. 340BSoftware.com is an example of such software. The Program is a federal program.

The 340B Drug Pricing Program, administered by the Office of Pharmacy Affairs, resulted from enactment of Public Law 102-585, the Veterans Health Care Act of 1992, which is codified as Section 340B of the Public Health Service Act. Section 340B limits the cost of covered outpatient drugs to more than 18,000 eligible entities including ten types of health care providers and programs funded by the Health Resources and Services Administration (HRSA) and hospitals that provide care to high volumes of patients that are either indigent or located in remote areas. These hospitals include disproportionate share hospitals, children's hospitals, sole community hospitals, rural referral centers, critical access hospitals, and cancer hospitals exempt from the Medicare prospective payment system.

As reported in the Department of Health and Human Services 2014 Justification of Estimates for Appropriations Committees, the 340B program cuts drug costs for participants, saving them an estimated $6 billion in discounted prescription drugs. These savings enable them to purchase the drugs for a price that is "at least 23.1 percent below the average manufacturer price (AMP) for brand name drugs, 13 percent below AMP for generic drugs; and 17.1 percent below AMP for clotting and pediatric drugs". These savings enable participants to provide more direct health care services to underserved populations. In recent years the program has seen a 3-4% annual growth rate.

Pharmaceuticals purchased at 340B pricing account for 2% of drugs purchased in the U.S. annually.

Hill-Burton Program 

The Hill-Burton Program requires 200 obligated health care facilities to provide free or reduced
cost health care to patients who are uninsured, unable to pay, and unqualified for Medicaid
coverage. In exchange for such services, the program previously funded grants and loans for new construction and improvements to 6,800 facilities nationwide. But most of those locations have discharged their obligations and no longer are in the program. Since 1980, almost $6 billion in uncompensated Hill-Burton services have been provided.

Healthcare and other facilities 

In FY 2008, HRSA monitored 940 projects worth $691 million for health care and health-related
facilities to meet their design, construction and equipment needs. Congress designates each of
the awardees on an individual basis.

Compensation programs

National Vaccine Injury Compensation Program (VICP) 

Most people who get vaccines have no serious problems. However, vaccines, like any medicines, can cause serious problems — such as severe allergic reactions — on certain rare occasions. In those cases, the VICP provides compensation to people who are found to be injured or killed by certain vaccines.

Countermeasures Injury Compensation Program 

Established by PREP Act, in the case of pandemic, epidemic, or other major security threat requiring a medical countermeasure, the CICP provides compensation to eligible individuals for serious physical injuries or death. Examples include:
 COVID-19
 Marburg
 nerve agents and certain insecticides (organophosphorus and/or carbamate)
 2009 A/H1N1 pandemic
 Zika
 Ebola
 smallpox
 anthrax
 botulism
 acute radiation syndrome and sequela

References

External links 

 Official website

Health Resources and Services Administration